Houari Boumediene International Airport , also known as Algiers Airport or Algiers International Airport, is the main international airport serving Algiers, the capital of Algeria.

The airport is named after Houari Boumediene (1932–1978), a former president of Algeria. Dar El Beïda, the area at which the airport is located, was known as Maison Blanche (White House), and the airport is called Maison Blanche Airport in much of the literature about the Algerian War of Independence. The Société de Gestion des Services et Infrastructures Aéroportuaires (SGSIA), more commonly known as "Airport of Algiers", is a Public Company established on 1 November 2006 to manage and operate the airport. The SGSIA has 2,100 employees.

History
The airport was created in 1924 and named Maison Blanche Airport.
During World War II, Maison Blanche Airport was a primary objective of the Allied Operation Torch Eastern Task Force on 8 November 1942 and was seized by a combination of United States Army units, British Commandos and elements of a British Infantry Division. Opposition by Vichy French forces who defended the airport ended that same day, as orders from Admiral Darlan in Algiers were issued to cease all hostilities in North Africa.

Hawker Hurricane Aircraft of No. 43 Squadron RAF under the Command of Squadron Leader Michael Rook landed at Maison Blanche shortly after 11.00 Hrs on 8 November, and began offensive patrols the next day. 43 Sqn remained at Maison Blanche until 13 March 1943, when the unit was deployed to Jemmapes, Constantine

Once in Allied hands, the airport was used by the United States Army Air Forces Air Transport Command as a major transshipment hub for cargo, transiting aircraft and personnel. It functioned as a stopover en route to Tafarquay Airport, near Oran or to Tunis Airport, Tunisia on the North African Cairo-Dakar transport route. It also flew personnel and cargo to Marseille, Milan, Naples and Palermo, Sicily. In addition, Twelfth Air Force A3 SECTION under the command of Lt. Col Carter E. Duncan 1943/44, used the airport as a command and control facility, headquartering its XII Bomber Command; XXII Tactical Air Command, and the 51st Troop Carrier Wing to direct combat and support missions during the North African Campaign against the German Afrika Korps Known Allied air force combat units assigned to the airfield were:

 No. 43 Squadron RAF 323 Wing RAF, 8 November 1942 -13 March 1943 Hawker Hurricane
 51st Troop Carrier Wing, 23 November 1942 – 28 March 1943
 63d Fighter Wing, May–August 1943
 97th Bombardment Group, 13–22 November 1942, B-17 Flying Fortress
 301st Bombardment Group, 5–16 December 1942, B-17 Flying Fortress
 319th Bombardment Group, 24–12 November 1942, B-26 Marauder
 14th Fighter Group, 18–22 November 1942, P-38 Lightning
 350th Fighter Group, May–July 1943, P-38 Lightning
 3d Reconnaissance Group, 25 December 1942 – 13 June 1943, (various photo reconnaissance aircraft)

Terminals

Terminal 1
The domestic terminal (Terminal 1) presents a capacity of 6 million passengers per year. It was inaugurated on 5 July 2006 by the President Abdelaziz Bouteflika. The terminal holds 5000 car parking spaces, a taxi stand, a boarding area of 27,000 m2, and 14 passenger gates. The hall 2 terminal 1 will be dedicated to domestic flights whereas the hall 1 will be dedicated to the middle east, and gulf airlines.

Terminal 2
The charter terminal (Terminal 2), renovated in 2007, has a capacity of 2.5 million passengers per year. It offers conditions of comfort and security comparable to those of Terminal 1. Its domestic traffic is 1.5 million passengers per year. Terminal 2 is equipped with 20 check-in desks with a cafeteria, tearoom and prayer room. The terminal also has a pharmacy, perfumery, a hairdresser, watch retailers, luggage shops, games and toys as well as a tobacco/newspaper shop. There are 900 car parking spaces, a taxi stand, a boarding area of 5,000 m2, with 7 gates, a luggage delivery area, and lounges for premium passengers.

Prior to Terminal 2's opening, Terminal 3 was used for operating domestic flights. In 2007, the terminal's use changed to pilgrimage and charter flights but since 2019 all of the charters and pilgrimage flights have been moved to terminal 2 and the former Terminal 3 will be demolished in order to build a new terminal.

Terminal 4
Terminal 4 opened on April 29, 2019. Its operations began in three different stages. The first was granted to flights bound for Paris by Air Algérie. A week later, all flights to France operated by Air Algérie were transferred to the terminal. The following week, all other international flights operated by Air Algérie were transferred to the new terminal. As of May 15, the other foreign airlines would also begin operations in this terminal. The terminal 4 has 120 check-in points, 84 check-in counters, 9 conveyor belts and 21 telescopic gateways. With a surface area of 73 hectares which currently accommodates an additional 10 million passengers per year and is also capable of accommodating Airbus A380 type aircraft.

Airlines and destinations

Passenger
The following airlines operate regular scheduled and charter flights at Algiers Airport:

Cargo

Statistics

Ground transport

Car
The distance to the center of Algiers is 20 km using the route N5 direct Bab Ezzouar. A1 also connects with N5 to the airport. Taxis service the airport to downtown Algiers.

Parking

The airport has a 7,000 capacity with two car parks located north of the terminals.

Bus

Buses link the airport to downtown Algiers every 30 minutes during the day with the line 100 of the  Algiers's public transport buses company (ETUSA).

Subway
The Algiers Metro Line L1 extension will connect the airport with the centre of Algiers.

Suburban rail
Since 2019 Algiers airport has a rail station, located between terminals 1 and 2. The train connects the Algiers downtown (Agha station) to the international airport with a stopover at El Harrach train station with trains of the commuter rail network of the SNTF. The train frequency is one train every 30 minutes with a 20-minute journey time.

Hotel park 
The new Hyatt Regency Hotel opened its doors on April 24, 2019, and is located across the street from the Terminal 4 with which it is connected. It is the first hotel of the Hyatt Hotels Corporation chain in Algeria. The hotel has 320 rooms and 3 restaurants, a swimming pool and a 2,200 m2 lobby, and 13 meeting rooms.

Accidents and incidents
 On 23 July 1968, three members of the Popular Front for the Liberation of Palestine hijacked El Al Flight 426, a Boeing 707 with 48 other people on board and diverted it to the airport. They eventually released all 48 hostages unharmed.
 On 24 December 1994, Air France Flight 8969, an Airbus A300 bound for Paris, was seized by four Islamic terrorists before takeoff; three passengers were killed before departure. In Marseille, France, a special operations team of the French Gendarmerie stormed the aircraft and killed all four hijackers; 25 passengers were injured.

Gallery

References

External links 

 Etablissement de Gestion de Services Aéroportuaires d’Alger (EGSA-Alger) 
 
 
 AIP AIC CARTES
 SGSIA Ministere des Transpots
 Stats Aircraft Movements 2015 2016
 Accurate Data

Airports in Algeria
Transport in Algiers
Airfields of the United States Army Air Forces Air Transport Command in North Africa
Airfields of the United States Army Air Forces in Algeria
World War II airfields in Algeria
Airports established in 1924
1924 establishments in Algeria
Buildings and structures in Algiers